Trude Guermonprez, born Gertrud Emilie Jalowetz (1910 1976), was a German-born American textile artist, designer and educator, known for her tapestry landscapes. Her Bauhaus-influenced disciplined abstraction for hand woven textiles greatly contributed to the American craft and fiber art movements of the 1950s, 60s and even into the 70s, particularly during her tenure at the California College of Arts and Crafts.

Early life and education

Gertrud Emilie Jalowetz was born on 9 November 1910 in Danzig, Germany (modern Gdańsk, Poland). Her parents were Austrian and were active in the arts. Her mother was Johanna Jalowetz (née Groag), was a voice teacher and bookbinder and her father was Heinrich Jalowetz was a musicologist.

She learned weaving while living in Halle, Germany, where she attended Burg Giebichenstein University of Art and Design (School of Fine and Applied Arts in Halle-Saale). Guermonprez studied textiles in Halle under Benita Otte. By 1933, she had received a degree from the Textile Engineering School in Berlin and scholarship to further her studies in Sweden and Finland.

In 1939, her parents relocated to the United States to teach at Black Mountain College near Asheville, North Carolina. She married a Bauhaus trained photographer in 1939, Paul Guermonprez, and they lived together in the Netherlands. Paul Guermonprez was working as a graphic designer and founded his own advertising company Co-op 2, prior to getting drafted for the Dutch army. By 1940, Germany occupied the Netherlands.

Paul Guermonprez died in 1944 by Nazi execution, while fighting in the Dutch resistance.

Career

Black Mountain College 
She relocated to the United States in 1947, with the support of Anni Albers. Guermonprez started her teaching career in the 1940s at Black Mountain College. In 1947, Guermonprez began teaching weaving and design at Black Mountain College while Anni Albers was away on sabbatical, and to be with her mother Johanna Jalowetz and sister Lisa Aronson, who were also at the school. Upon Anni's return, Guermonprez was asked to continue as a full-time faculty member. She remained at Black Mountain College until the dissolution of the weaving program in 1949.

Pond Farm Workshops and San Francisco 
After leaving Black Mountain college, Guermonprez moved West and joined the Pond Farm artist collective run by Bauhaus-trained ceramicist Marguerite Wildenhain in Guerneville, California, and taught at the Pond Farm Workshops. While at Pond Farms she met John Elsesser.

By March 24, 1951, she married John Elsesser (1897–1991), a carpenter and furniture builder. The couple moved to San Francisco, living at 810 Clipper Street in an older home her husband had restored. By December 1952, she had naturalized in the United States.

California College of the Arts 
In 1954, Guermonprez joined the faculty of California College of the Arts (CCA, formerly California College of Arts and Crafts). By 1960, she served as the Chair of the Crafts Department at CCA, overseeing: metal arts, ceramics, glass blowing, stitchery and textile printing, as well as supervising the weaving curriculum. Her students included Kay Sekimachi Stocksdale, Sheila O'Hara, Ann Wilson, and Jane Lackey, among others.

She additionally worked teaching at Oakland College and at the San Francisco Art Institute.

Textile work 
Throughout her career, the majority of her work was private commission. She sometimes worked with her husband John Elsesser who would build furniture, and Guermonprez would create textiles for upholstery.

Guermonprez combined the painterly possibilities of silkscreen with the structural geometry implicit in warp and weft to create fiber wall hangings that are both texturally rich and delicately drawn. She was also known to paint directly on the warp.

Trude Guermonprez had two solo exhibits at the De Young Museum, one in 1964 and one 1970. Guermonprez was awarded the Craftsmanship Medal of the American Institute of Architects (1970) for her "distinguished creative design" in textiles and weaving. She was a fellow at the American Craft Council (1975).

Death and legacy 
Guermonprez died on 8 May 1976, after a short illness at Mount Zion Hospital in San Francisco, California.

Guermonprez's work is included in various public museum collections including the Art Institute of Chicago, Cooper-Hewitt, National Design Museum, Los Angeles County Museum of Art, Oakland Museum of California, among others.

Posthumously she had a solo exhibition at the Oakland Museum of California, The Tapestries of Trude Guermonprez (1982).

References

Further reading
 Trude Guermonprez papers, circa 1900-1987, bulk 1932-1976, Archives of American Art, Smithsonian Institution

1910 births
1976 deaths
Black Mountain College faculty
California College of the Arts faculty
People from West Prussia
American textile artists
Women textile artists
German women artists
20th-century American women artists
German emigrants to the United States
20th-century American artists
20th-century German artists
People from Guerneville, California
Artists from San Francisco
German textile artists
American people of Austrian-Jewish descent
American women academics
20th-century German women